Masama Rundugai  is an administrative ward in Hai District of Kilimanjaro Region in Tanzania. According to the 2012 census, the ward has a total population of 14,033.

References

Wards of Hai District
Wards of Kilimanjaro Region